P. P. George (1935–2008), in full P. Poulose George, was an Indian National Congress politician from Thrissur and Member of the Legislative Assembly from Chalakudy in 1965, 1967 and 1970, from Thiruvambady in 1987 and from Ollur in 1991 and 2001. He was the Agriculture Minister in 1991 Ministry.

Early life
George was a senior Congress leader born on 25th July 1935, son of Poulose and Mary at Pudukkadu Thrissur district Kerala. A teacher by profession he entered politics through Congress. The veteran Congress leader passed away on 5th January 2008, aged 72.

Political career
He had also been actively engaged in trade union activities since the 1950's.
In 1959-1960 he was the General convenor of Kerala liberation struggle moment in Thrissur district.

 Political Positions 

 1962-2008 KPCC member
 1965-2001 KPCC executive member
 1969-1972 AICC member
 1971-1977 Secretary of Congress parliamentary party
 1976-1977 Estimate committee chairman Kerala legislative assembly
 1978-1998 KPCC General Secretary
 1982-1986 Director, K.T.D.C.
 1986-1987 Vice Chairman, Kerala Khadi & village industries board
 1981-1982 D.C.C. President, Thrissur
 1965, 1967, 1970, 1987, 1991, 2001 Member Kerala Legislative Assembly
 1991-1995 Agriculture Minister govt. of Kerala
 2001-2006 whip of Congress parliamentary party

A staunch supporter and close aide of leader K. Karunakaran, in 2005 he parted the ways with him, when Karunakaran quit Congress to form a new party D.I.C. (K).

References

Indian National Congress politicians from Kerala
Malayali politicians
People from Chalakudy
1935 births
2008 deaths
Kerala MLAs 1967–1970
Kerala MLAs 1970–1977
Kerala MLAs 1980–1982
Kerala MLAs 1982–1987
Kerala MLAs 1991–1996
Politicians from Thrissur